Tamás Borsos de Ozd (Hungarian ponounciation:; Marosvásárhely, 14 June 1566 – after 1633) was a Hungarian politician and diplomat in the Principality of Transylvania, who served as mayor of Marosvásárhely (now: Târgu Mureș, Romania), then ambassador of Gabriel Bethlen, Prince of Transylvania to the Ottoman Empire.

Life

He was the son of historian Sebestény Borsos. In 1597, he served as notary, from 1602 till 1604, he was the mayor (chief judge) of Marosvásárhely.

During the fights of the Long War, the old fortress of Marosvásárhely was destroyed, and did not give shelter to the inhabitants. Among many townfolk, Tamás Borsos found shelter in Kronstadt, city of the Transylvanian Saxons. Seeing the city's castle, he was said to exclaim: "Oh, if only I could build just one of its bastions in Marosvásárhely, there would be no need for the people to seek refuge in the woods in case of danger". During the time of his office as chief judge he wrote several applications to the prince of Transylvania and to the Turkish sultan to request permission to construct a fortress. After obtaining the necessary approvals, the construction began in 1602. First, the damaged fortress church was restored, then the bastions and the ten-meter thick walls were built. The city's population contributed significantly to the construction of the castle and bastions as the guilds of the city undertook the construction costs and work of five out of seven bastions.

He was the representative of his hometown on the session of the Transylvanian parliament held in Dés (now: Dej, Romania) in 1603. From 1605, he was appointed judge to the High Court of the Prince of Transylvania. In 1606, he was a member of the Transylvanian parliament, and made known to prince István Bocskay that Marosvásárhely recognised his rule.

Tamás Borsos is renowned for being one of the first Hungarian diplomats. In the years of 1613, 1618 and 1625, he was the ambassador of Transylvania to the Sublime Porte of the Ottoman Empire, in Constantinople. He acted as a commissioner of Prince Gabriel Bethlen at peace treaties of Nagyszombat (1615) and of Gyarmat (1625). In 1630, he was the envoy of Transylvania to the Turkish vezir of Buda. He died after 1633.

His diplomatic letters written in Hungarian language to Gabriel Bethlen, prince of Transylvania, and his other manuscripts are important sources for the study of the political history of Transylvania.

Works

 Manuscripts describing the political events in Transylvania between 1584 and 1612 
 Diary on his first diplomatic mission to the Sublime Porte (1614)
 Diary on his second diplomatic mission to the Sublime Porte (1618–20)
 Memoriale (diplomatic mission to the vezír of Buda in 1630)
 Vásárhelytől a Fényes Portáig ("From Vásárhely to the Sublime Porte"). Mémoires and diplomatic correspondence of Tamás Borsos, published in 1972 by Kriterion Könyvkiadó, Bucharest

References

Bibliography
Szamota István: Régi magyar utazók (Old Hungarian Travellers (Nagybecskerek, 1892).
Barts Gyula: Marosvásárhelyi Borsos Tamás élete és történeti szereplése (Life and Historical Activity of Tamás Borsos of Marosvásárhely (Kolozsvár, 1912).

1566 births
Year of death unknown
Mayors of places in Romania
People from Târgu Mureș
Hungarian diplomats
16th-century Hungarian people
17th-century Hungarian people
People of the Principality of Transylvania